San Vicente de Alcántara is a municipality in the province of Badajoz, Extremadura, Spain. It has a population of 5,788 and an area of 275 km².

References

External links
Ayuntamiento de San Vicente de Alcántara 

Municipalities in the Province of Badajoz